The Cossacks is a 1960 Italian epic adventure film directed by Victor Tourjansky and Giorgio Rivalta and starring Edmund Purdom, John Drew Barrymore and Giorgia Moll.

Plot

The movie centers around Shamil, who is determined to go to war for the freedom of his people, while his son is caught between his old family loyalties and the realization that his father's nation requires peace.  The film offers a nuanced depiction of both sides, displaying a level of sensitivity that is unexpected in this type of movie. In a particularly impactful scene, the Chechen artillery bombards the Russian army's camp while the soldiers are in the middle of mass celebration.  The movie provides a unique perspective on an uncommon subject matter and showcases a rare humanity and sense of impartiality towards the different sides involved in the conflict portrayed in the story.

Cast 
 Edmund Purdom as Sheik Shamil
 John Drew Barrymore as Giamal
 Giorgia Moll as Tatiana
 Pierre Brice as Boris
 Elena Zareschi as Fátima
 Erno Crisa as Casi
 Massimo Girotti as Czar Alexander II
 Maria Grazia Spina as Alina
 Mario Pisu as Voronzov
 Laura Carli as Miss Ferguson
 Nerio Bernardi as General Rasumovsky
 Louis Seigner as Bibikoff, old Russian General
 Giuliano Gemma as Young Man at Academy (uncredited)
 Mara Berni as Lady with White Dog
 Liana Del Balzo as Grandduchess, Aunt of Tsar (uncredited)

References

External links
 
 
 
 The Cossacks at Variety Distribution

1960 films
Italian adventure films
Films directed by Victor Tourjansky
Italian epic films
Films scored by Giovanni Fusco
1960s Italian films